Bourbonnais is a village in Kankakee County, Illinois, United States. The population was 18,164 at the 2020 census.

History
The village is named for François Jace Bourbonnais Sr., a fur trapper, hunter and agent of the American Fur Company, who had married a Native American woman and arrived in the area near the fork of two major Indian trails and the Kankakee River circa 1830. John Jacob Astor had founded the company in 1808, and when the United States banned foreign (i.e. British and Canadian) companies (such as the Hudson's Bay Company) from competing in the country after the War of 1812, it flourished. By 1830 it had a near monopoly of fur trading in the midwest, but the number of local trappable wild animals had declined.

In 1832, Noel Le Vasseur arrived as the Astor firm local fur trading agent, establishing a trading post in the area, and becoming the first permanent non-Native American settler. He married Watseka, niece of a Potawatomi chieftain, and after the Potawatomi were relocated to Iowa, recruited French-Canadiens to settle around his store. The Potawatomi were forced to move westward by a series of treaties culminating in the Treaty of Tippecanoe, which Congress ratified in 1833. The treaty reserved two sections for Potawanomi chief Me-she-ke-te-no, and one section each for Catish (Mrs. Bourbonnais Sr.) and Manteno (daughter of Francois Bourbonnais Jr.). LeVasseur received considerable land through a series of shrewd trades, and eventually divorced Watseka and married a Canadian woman named Ruth. After establishment of the new Catholic diocese of Chicago, missionary Fr. Stephen Badin briefly settled in Bourbonnais Grove in 1846, before retiring further south.

 
In 1853, the Illinois legislature split Iroquois County, and Bourbonnais Grove became part of new Kankakee County. Because the Illinois Central Railroad ran through Kankakee, founded in 1854, it became the county seat, with Bourbonnais Grove as one of several townships. In 1858 residents built the Maternity of the Blessed Virgin Mary Church, and soon nuns of the Congregation of Notre Dame arrived from Canada to teach and provide nursing care. Two years later they founded Notre Dame Academy. In 1865 clerics of St. Viator founded St. Viator College for boys.

After a referendum in 1875, the settlement incorporated as the Village of Bourbonnais, with George R. LeTourneau as its first mayor, and trustees Francois Sequin, Joseph Legris, Alexis Gosselin, P.L. Monast, Alex LaMontagne, Joseph Goulet, Jacob Thyfault and Len Bessette. LeVasseur died, aged 80, four years later. LeTourneau also became mayor and sheriff of Kankakee as well as state senator; his home (begun in 1837 and with renovations completed in 1866) eventually became headquarters of the local historical society, which is also restoring the garden and nearby arboretum. After enrollment declines in the early 20th century, in 1940, the Catholic institutions were bought out by what became Olivet Nazarene University, since the Protestant school in nearby Vermillion County had burned down the previous year.

In 1999, the town was the site of a major train wreck, the Bourbonnais train accident.

Bourbonnais was home of the summertime training camp of the Chicago Bears professional football team from 2002 to 2019. In 2020, the team relocated training camp to their headquarters at Halas Hall in Lake Forest, Illinois after major renovations of the building complex.

Geography

Pronunciation
In 1976, for the U.S. Bicentennial, the Village Board passed a resolution making "ber-buh-NAY" the official pronunciation.

Demographics

As of the 2010 United States Census, there were 18,854 people, 6,387 households in the village. The population density was 1,950.6/sqmi. The racial makeup of the village was 75.3% White alone, not Hispanic or Latino, 9.5% African American, 0.0% Native American, 2.3% Asian, 0.0% Pacific Islander, and 5.8% from two or more races. Hispanic or Latino of any race were 8.0% of the population.

The village population contained 19% under the age of 18 and 14.4% who were 65 years of age or older. There is a slightly higher percent of female persons at 52.9%.

The median income for a household in the village was $76,920. The per capita income for the village was $30,972. About 7.1% of the population were below the poverty line.

Education
Bourbonnais shares a high school, Bradley-Bourbonnais Community High School (BBCHS), with Bradley, Illinois The Kankakee Area Career Center (KACC) serves local area high school students as a vocational and technical education institution. Bourbonnais is served by three private high schools: Bishop McNamara Catholic School (Catholic), Grace Christian Academy (non-denominational), and Kankakee Trinity Academy (inter-denominational ).The village is home to Olivet Nazarene University (ONU), on the site of the old St. Viator College campus.

Chicago Bears training camp
The Chicago Bears of the National Football League held their annual summer training camp at Olivet Nazarene University in Bourbonnais from 2002 through 2019.

Shopping
The town's main shopping mall is Northfield Square. Many new stores have been built and introduced, however, in the following years just down the road from the mall.

References

External links
 Official website

Villages in Kankakee County, Illinois
Villages in Illinois
Populated places established in 1830
1830 establishments in Illinois